Petlim is a container port currently being built by Petkim corporation in Aegean Turkey. 40 km north of Izmir and near the town of Aliağa.

References

Ports and harbours of Turkey